Two-time defending champion Serena Williams defeated Elena Dementieva in the final, 6–1, 6–1 to win the women's singles tennis title at the 2004 Miami Open.

This tournament marked the first career meeting between Serena Williams and Maria Sharapova; Williams won in straight sets in their fourth-round encounter.

Seeds
All seeded players received a bye into the second round.

Draw

Finals

Top half

Section 1

Section 2

Section 3

Section 4

Bottom half

Section 5

Section 6

Section 7

Section 8

Qualifying

Qualifying seeds

Qualifiers

Lucky losers

Qualifying draw

First qualifier

Second qualifier

Third qualifier

Fourth qualifier

Fifth qualifier

Sixth qualifier

Seventh qualifier

Eighth qualifier

Ninth qualifier

Tenth qualifier

Eleventh qualifier

Twelfth qualifier

References

External links
 Official results archive (ITF)
 Official results archive (WTA)

2004 NASDAQ-100 Open
NASDAQ-100